Gunnar Flikke (born 3 November 1947) is a Norwegian newspaper editor.

He was born in Steinkjer. He worked as a freelancer in Trønder-Avisa, Morgenavisen and the Norwegian Broadcasting Corporation, before being journalist and sub-editor in Adresseavisen from 1970 to 1971 and 1974 to 1988. He was editor-in-chief of Billedbladet NÅ from 1988, then in Adresseavisen from 1989 to 2006.

He has been deputy chairman of the Association of Norwegian Editors. In 2010 he became a board member of the Norwegian Broadcasting Corporation.

References

1947 births
Living people
People from Steinkjer
Norwegian magazine editors
Norwegian newspaper editors